The 2001–02 Midland Football Alliance season was the eighth in the history of Midland Football Alliance, a football competition in England.

Clubs and league table
The league featured 18 clubs from the previous season, along with five new clubs:
Bromsgrove Rovers, relegated from the Southern Football League
Ludlow Town, promoted from the West Midlands (Regional) League
Paget Rangers, relegated from the Southern Football League
Quorn, promoted from the Leicestershire Senior League
Studley B K L, promoted from the Midland Football Combination

League table

References

External links
 Midland Football Alliance

2001–02
8